Vladimir Orlando Cardoso de Araújo Filho (born 16 July 1989), simply known as Vladimir, is a Brazilian footballer who plays as a goalkeeper for Santos.

Club career

Santos
Born in Ipiaú, Bahia, Vladimir graduated from Santos' youth system. On 18 September 2009, he was loaned to Fortaleza, but failed to make an appearance with the club (being only third-choice goalkeeper), and returned to his parent club two months later.

On 2 February 2011 Vladimir made his first team debut, replacing field player Anderson Carvalho in a 2–2 away draw against Ponte Preta, after Rafael was sent off. He was handed his first start three days later, in a 1–1 away draw against Santo André.

Mainly a backup to Rafael, Vladimir was further demoted after Aranha's arrival in 2012, being only selected on the bench in some occasions during that year. Rafael subsequently left in 2013, and he subsequently was a backup to Aranha.

In September 2014, profiting from Aranha's injury, Vladimir appeared more regularly until the return of the former, only suffering one goal in the process. On 14 January 2015 he signed a new deal with Peixe, until December.

In 2015, after new signing Vanderlei suffered an injury, Vladimir was a starter in that year's Campeonato Paulista winning campaign. He made a double recovery save in a 1–1 away draw against Corinthians on 5 April (it was also his first derby as a professional), and saved a penalty in the shoot-out in the final against Palmeiras on 3 May.

On 21 August 2015, after already returning to the bench, Vladimir renewed his contract until December 2016. On 26 September of the following year he further extended his link, signing until 2018.

In 2017, as Vanderlei suffered another injury, Vladimir again became a regular starter. Despite already winning the Copa Libertadores in 2011 as a third-choice, he made his debut in the competition on 9 March 2017 by starting in a 1–1 away draw against Sporting Cristal.

Avaí (loan)
On 24 January 2019, Vladimir joined fellow top tier side Avaí on a one-year loan deal. He became an undisputed starter for the side, winning the Campeonato Catarinense but suffering relegation from the top tier.

Return from loan
Initially a backup to Everson, Vladimir became the first-choice after the departure of the former to Atlético Mineiro until suffering a foot injury in August. He was subsequently overtaken by João Paulo.

On 10 November 2020, it was announced that Vladimir and a further six first team players tested positive for COVID-19. On 29 June 2021, after being a third-choice behind João Paulo and John, he rescinded with Santos on a mutual agreement.

Return to Avaí
On 2 July 2021, Vladimir returned to Avaí, with the club now in the Série B. The following 13 January, despite being only a backup option to Glédson, he renewed his contract for a further year.

Vladimir started the 2022 season as a second-choice behind new signing Douglas Friedrich, but became a starter after the latter left. On 19 December of that year, he left the club after failing to agree new terms.

Return to Santos
On 28 December 2022, Vladimir returned to his first club Santos on a two-year deal.

Career statistics

Honours
Santos
Campeonato Paulista: 2010, 2011, 2012, 2015, 2016
Copa do Brasil: 2010
Copa Libertadores: 2011
Recopa Sudamericana: 2012

Avaí
Campeonato Catarinense: 2019

References

External links
Santos FC official profile 

1989 births
Living people
Sportspeople from Bahia
Brazilian footballers
Association football goalkeepers
Campeonato Brasileiro Série A players
Santos FC players
Avaí FC players